The 1st Writers Guild of America Awards honored the best film writers of 1948. Winners were announced in 1949.

Winners and nominees

Film 
Winners are listed first highlighted in boldface.

References

External links 
WGA.org

1948
WGA
1948 in American cinema